Malawi participated at the 2018 Summer Youth Olympics in Buenos Aires, Argentina from 6 October to 18 October 2018.

Athletics

Swimming

References

You
Nations at the 2018 Summer Youth Olympics
Malawi at the Youth Olympics